Atta Boafo Daniel Kingsley is a Ghanaian politician and member of the Seventh Parliament of the Fourth Republic of Ghana representing Fomena constituency in the Ashanti Region of Ghana under the flag of New Patriotic Party.

Career 
He was a Transport Analyst at the Kumasi Metropolitan Assembly. He was elected in January 2017 after defeating his opposition party leading with 67.756% of the total vote cast.

References 

1959 births
People from Ashanti Region
Ghanaian MPs 2017–2021
New Patriotic Party politicians
Living people